The Adal Island is an island located near the Timbun Mata island in Sabah, Malaysia.

See also
 List of islands of Malaysia

External links 
 Pulau Adal on geoview.info

Islands of Sabah